Korolyov is the name of several inhabited localities in Russia.

Urban localities
Korolyov, Moscow Oblast, a city in Moscow Oblast

Rural localities
Korolyov, Rostov Oblast, a khutor in Verbovologovskoye Rural Settlement of Dubovsky District of Rostov Oblast